Sabrine Ellouzi (born 28 June 1997) is a footballer who plays as a forward for Eredivisie club Feyenoord. Born in the Netherlands, she represents Tunisia at international level.

Club career
Ellouzi has played for Twente since 2009 having progressed from the academy to the first team in 2015.

International career
Ellouzi, who has dual Dutch nationality, made her debut for the Tunisia national team on 10 June 2021, starting the match against Jordan.

International goals
Scores and results list Tunisia's goal tally first

See also
List of Tunisia women's international footballers

References

External links

1997 births
Living people
Citizens of Tunisia through descent
Tunisian women's footballers
Women's association football forwards
Tunisia women's international footballers
Sportspeople from Hengelo
Footballers from Overijssel
Dutch women's footballers
FC Twente (women) players
Dutch people of Tunisian descent
Feyenoord (women) players